Siple Ridge is a high (2,570 m) ridge, 3 nautical miles (6 km) long and 0.5 nautical miles (0.9 km) wide, being the more northern of two ridges that extend west from the Mount Feather block, in the Quartermain Mountains, Victoria Land. The narrow upper surface is capped by ice but rock is exposed at many points along abrupt cliffs. Named by Advisory Committee on Antarctic Names (US-ACAN) in 1992 after Ruth J. Siple, widow of renowned Antarctican Paul A. Siple (Mount Siple, q.v.); Honorary President and active supporter of The Antarctican Society; Honored Guest at the dedication of the new U.S. Amundsen-Scott South Pole Station at the site on January 9, 1975.

Ridges of Victoria Land
Scott Coast